Thomas C. Harris (October 4, 1923 – January 4, 1991) was an American Negro league catcher in the 1940s.

A native of Canton, Ohio, Harris made his Negro leagues debut with the Cleveland Buckeyes in 1946, and played three seasons for Cleveland. He died in Stone Mountain, Georgia in 1991 at age 67.

References

External links
 and Seamheads

1923 births
1991 deaths
Cleveland Buckeyes players
20th-century African-American sportspeople
Baseball catchers